Handeni Town Council also known as Handeni Urban District is one of the 11 districts of the Tanga Region of Tanzania. The administrative capital of the district is Mdoe. Handeni Town District is bordered to the east by Handeni District and the west by Kilindi District.

Administrative subdivisions
As of 2012, Handeni Town Council was administratively divided into 12 wards.

Wards

Transport
A paved secondary road connects Handeni with Korogwe in the northeast and Mkata in the southeast; both Korogwe and Mkata are on the T2 Trunk road from Dar es Salaam to Arusha.

References 

Districts of Tanga Region